Kloten may refer to:

Kloten, a city in Switzerland
Zurich Airport, the airport in Kloten
Kloten Flyers, an icehockey team
Kloten, Wisconsin, an unincorporated community
Kloten, North Dakota, an unincorporated community

See also
Klotten